The London Borough of Hillingdon is the largest and westernmost borough in West London, England. It was formed in 1965 from the districts of Hayes and Harlington, Ruislip-Northwood, Uxbridge, and Yiewsley and West Drayton in the ceremonial county of Middlesex. Today, Hillingdon is home to Heathrow Airport (which straddles the border between Hillingdon and Hounslow) and Brunel University, and is the second largest of the 32 London boroughs by area.

The main towns in the borough are Hayes, Ruislip, Northwood, West Drayton and Uxbridge. Hillingdon is the second least densely populated of the London boroughs, due to a combination of large rural land in the north, RAF Northolt Aerodrome, and the large Heathrow Airport.

Governance

Administrative history
The borough was formed in 1965 from the Hayes and Harlington Urban District, Municipal Borough of Uxbridge, Ruislip-Northwood Urban District, and Yiewsley and West Drayton Urban District, all formerly in the ceremonial county of Middlesex. The councils involved were initially unable to decide upon a name, with Keith Joseph suggesting "Uxbridge" in October 1963, later revised to Hillingdon.

The coat of arms for the London Borough of Hillingdon was granted on 22 March 1965. Between 1973 and 1978, the borough's civic centre was built in Uxbridge.

Hillingdon Council

Hillingdon Council provides local government services in the borough, with its headquarters in the Civic Centre in Uxbridge. For administrative purposes, the borough is split into North and South Hillingdon.

The borough has an elected council, known either by the full name or as Hillingdon Council. It is split into wards represented by 65 Conservative and Labour councillors. A cabinet and leader are elected annually. The present leader of the council is Cllr. Ian Edwards of the Conservative Party. Elections for councillors are held every four years.

A Mayor is chosen yearly by councillors; the role is largely ceremonial. The present mayor is Councillor Roy Chamdal (Brunel Ward), who was elected on 20 May 2021.

Wards
The London Borough of Hillingdon is divided into a total of 22 wards:

London Assembly
In the London assembly elections, Ealing and Hillingdon Borough form a geographical constituency with one member as there are eleven London-wide members, currently from the four biggest parties. Conservative candidate Richard Barnes won the 2000, 2004 and 2008 elections, and since the 2012 election the Labour candidate Onkar Sahota has served as the area's designated member on the London Assembly.

At the same election in 2012 Conservative mayoral candidate Boris Johnson won the largest share of Hillingdon's votes in becoming elected Mayor of London for a second term.

Demographics

Population
From 2001 to 2011 the borough's population grew by 11.5% (4.4% above the England and Wales mean of 7.1%). By comparison Merton and Bromley grew by 4.5% and Tower Hamlets grew by 26.4%. The number of households increased from 2001 to 2011 by 3.3%, and the average number of people per household was 2.7.

Ethnicity
37.1% of the borough's population identified themselves as White British in the 2021 census. In the south-east of the borough, in particular Hayes there is a high population of South Asian residents.

The wards where Black, Asian and Minority Ethnic Residents comprise the largest racial groups are:
Barnhill (partly covering eastern Hayes, south of Yeading),
Pinkwell (mostly the area around the railway station in southern Hayes),
Townfield (Part of eastern Hayes and west of Southall),
Yeading (Eastern Hayes)

Whites as a whole form 48.2% of the borough, Asian residents 33.3%, and Black residents 7.8%. In addition, the most common main language, English (77.9%), is followed by Punjabi (4.7%), Polish (1.7%), Tamil (1.6%) and Urdu (1.1%).

Parks and recreation

As much of the area is within the Metropolitan Green Belt it was, in 2008, one of the least densely populated of all the London boroughs; open spaces range in size from the Colne Valley Regional Park by the River Colne in the north of the borough, to smaller gardens and parks such as the Norman Leddy Memorial Gardens and Lake Farm Country Park in the south of the borough.

Council leader Raymond Puddifoot had given a promise that green-belt land in Hillingdon would be safe on his watch: 'I can give a categoric assurance that under this administration we will never see a threat to the green belt.' In August 2012, however, Mr Puddifoot announced plans to build on green-belt (and longtime common land) site Lake Farm in the south of the borough. Dismissing the discontent of residents in the south of the borough, the Conservative majority of the council's planning committee peremptorily rubber-stamped the plans in March 2013.

Harmondsworth Moor, a park owned by the borough, is administered by British Airways on behalf of the borough. After British Airways planned to create a new headquarters in 1992, the airline agreed to convert a former landfill site into Harmondsworth Moor.

The Grand Union Canal passes through Hayes, Yiewsley, Cowley and Uxbridge in the Borough. Ruislip Lido was built as a feeder reservoir for the canal, but was eventually disconnected and changed to become a recreational lido. Two Sites of Special Scientific Interest next to the canal, Frays Farm Meadows and Denham Lock Wood, are managed by the London Wildlife Trust.

The borough also operates children's centres, recreational areas for children of under five years of age and their families. The centres include: Barra Hall, Belmore, Cherry Lane, Colham Manor, Cornerstone, Cowley St. Laurence, Harefield, Hillside, McMillan Early Childhood Centre, Nestles Avenue, Oak Farm, and Uxbridge College (Hayes Campus).

The borough owns four theatres: the Beck Theatre in Hayes (which is operated on behalf of the borough by HQ Theatres Limited), the Compass Theatre in Ickenham, the Winston Churchill Theatre and Hall (part of the Manor Farm site) and the Open Air Theatre, Barra Hall Park in Hayes.

Sport and leisure
The Borough has seven Non-League football clubs:
A.F.C. Hayes, who play at Farm Park, Hayes.
Harefield United F.C., who play at Preston Park, Harefield.
Hayes & Yeading United F.C., who play at Skyex Community Stadium, Hayes.
Hillingdon Borough F.C. who play at the Middlesex Stadium, Ruislip.
Northwood F.C. who play at the Northwood Park Stadium, Northwood.
Uxbridge F.C. who play at Honeycroft, Yiewsley.
Wealdstone F.C. who play at Grosvenor Vale, Ruislip.
The borough is also home to Hillingdon Outdoor Activity Centre (HOAC), a water sports and activity centre. The center is home to a number of independently run sports clubs:
 Queensmead Sailing Club
 Hillingdon Rowing Club
 Hillingdon Junior Canoe Club
 Harrow Angling Club

Economy

Economic history
The south's former strong connection with industry has diminished since the 1980s to be replaced by a preponderantly residential suburban population; the north has remained a consistently residential suburban area, although with significant swathes of rural land. The borough's residential areas expanded with the extension of the Metropolitan Railway from Harrow on the Hill to Uxbridge in the early 20th century and the gradual establishment of stops along the line, becoming known as "Metro-land".

Contemporary economy
Hillingdon has a large economy by national standards, ranked 14th out of 408 local area districts in Britain, and ranked fifth out of the London boroughs.

British Airways is headquartered in Waterside, Harmondsworth, in Hillingdon. The building officially opened in 1998. Prior to the opening of Waterside, the airline's head office was the Speedbird House at London Heathrow Airport. An office of American Airlines is located at the Orient House (HAA3) within Waterside.

In 2007 Cadbury Schweppes announced it would be moving to Uxbridge from Mayfair to cut costs. The company later split and Cadbury plc moved to its new head office in Cadbury House in the Uxbridge Business Park in June 2008.

Guoman Hotel Management (UK) Limited has its head office in the Thistle London Heathrow in West Drayton.

British Midland International had its training centre in Stockley Close, West Drayton. Hellenic Imperial Airways had its United Kingdom offices in the Axis House in Harlington in the London Borough of Hillingdon. China Airlines had its UK office in the Hyde Park Hayes 3 (HPH3) in Hayes in the borough.

One of the predecessor organisations of British Airways, British Overseas Airways Corporation had its head office in the Speedbird House. The other predecessor, British European Airways had its headquarters in South Ruislip, as did BEA Helicopters. During its existence the airline British Eagle had its head office on the grounds of Heathrow Airport.

A 2017 study by Trust for London and New Policy Institute found that there is a 22% poverty rate in Hillingdon, slightly below the London-wide figure of 27%.  It also found that 24% of Hillingdon's local employees are low-paid, narrowly above the London average of 21%.

Government facilities

London Heathrow airport is located in this borough and is one of the busiest airports in the world. It was originally used by the Royal Air Force.
The British Government's UK Visas and Immigration has two immigration removal centres: Colnbrook Immigration Removal Centre and Harmondsworth Immigration Removal Centre in Harmondsworth.

The borough includes RAF Northolt and the former sites of RAF Eastcote, RAF South Ruislip, RAF West Drayton, RAF Ruislip 4MU, RAF West Ruislip and RAF Uxbridge.

Education

The borough maintains seventeen libraries: Charville, Eastcote, Harefield, Harlington, Hayes End, Hayes, Ickenham, Manor Farm, Northwood Hills, Northwood, Oak Farm, Ruislip Manor, South Ruislip, Uxbridge, West Drayton, Yeading, and Yiewsley.

Hillingdon has undertaken the largest school expansion programme in London, ensuring that all children within the Borough can go to a school close to where they live.

In May 2011, Hillingdon Council received the Library Innovation of the Year award at the 2011 Bookseller Industry Awards.

Also within the borough is Brunel University and Uxbridge College's Uxbridge and Hayes campuses.

Transport

National Rail and London Underground stations in the borough are:
Eastcote tube station
Hatton Cross tube station
Hayes and Harlington railway station
Heathrow Central railway station
Heathrow Terminals 1, 2, 3 tube station
Heathrow Terminal 4 railway station
Heathrow Terminal 4 tube station
Heathrow Terminal 5 station
Hillingdon tube station
Ickenham tube station
Northwood Hills tube station
Northwood tube station
Ruislip Gardens tube station
Ruislip Manor tube station
Ruislip tube station
South Ruislip station
Uxbridge tube station
West Ruislip station
West Drayton railway station

In March 2011, the main forms of transport that residents used to travel to work were: driving a car or van, 34.5% of all residents aged 16–74; underground, metro, light rail, tram, 7.9%; bus, minibus or coach, 7.9%; on foot, 4.6%; train, 2.8%; work mainly at or from home, 2.6%; passenger in a car or van, 2.0%.

Proposals
The council announced in June 2011 that it would be lobbying Transport for London to have the Central line extended from West Ruislip station to Uxbridge station. Such a project would require a business case approved by TfL and the completion of signal upgrade work on the Metropolitan line.

The Royal Air Force station, RAF Northolt, is situated in South Ruislip near the A40 and the tube station. Most early RAF airfields were named after the nearest railway station; in this case Northolt Junction, the original name of South Ruislip station. The station has been redeveloped in recent years to house a number of additional military capabilities besides the RAF operations, and is popular with business people and politicians for private flights.

Town twinning
Hillingdon is twinned with:
 Mantes-la-Jolie, France
 Schleswig, Schleswig-Holstein, Germany

The borough has been twinned with the French town of Mantes-la-Jolie and the German town of Schleswig since the Hayes & Harlington Urban District created the link in 1958. The twinning programme was reviewed in 2011 and it was suggested that the link with Schleswig be ended owing to a lack of contact between the towns. In December 2011, the borough decided instead to end the link with a second German town, Emden, citing administrative problems.

See also

2010 Hillingdon Council election
Hillingdon local elections

Notes and references
Notes 

References

Bibliography
 Cotton, Carolynne. (1994) Uxbridge Past. London: Historical Publications

External links

 
 Hillingdon Association of Voluntary Services
 Index to all Hillingdon streets
 List of parks and open spaces
 

 
Hillingdon
1965 establishments in the United Kingdom